Cristian Rivero Sabater (born 21 March 1998) is a Spanish professional footballer who plays as a goalkeeper for La Liga club Valencia.

Club career
Born in Gandia, Valencian Community, Rivero joined Valencia CF's youth setup in 2007 at the age of nine, from UD Portuarios Disarp. He made his senior debut with the reserves on 20 August 2017, starting in a 2–0 Segunda División away win against Deportivo Aragón.

Rivero immediately became an undisputed starter for the B-team, and renewed his contract until 2022 on 20 December 2019. For the 2020–21 season, he was definitely promoted to the main squad after the injury of Jasper Cillessen.

Rivero made his first team debut on 16 December 2020, starting in a 4–2 away win against Terrassa FC in the first round of the season's Copa del Rey. His professional debut occurred the following 17 January, as he played the full 90 minutes in a 2–0 away defeat of AD Alcorcón, in the last 16 of the national cup.

On 2 June 2021, Rivero renewed his contract with the Che until 2024. Despite renewing, he became a fourth-choice option behind Jasper Cillessen, Jaume Doménech and new signing Giorgi Mamardashvili.

On 28 January 2022, after a failed loan move to FC Dallas, Rivero joined Segunda División side Alcorcón on loan for the remainder of the campaign. He played only three games, with Dani Jiménez preferred. While Cillessen left that summer, the addition of Iago Herrerín kept Rivero at fourth choice.

References

External links
Profile at the Valencia CF website

1998 births
Living people
People from Gandia
Sportspeople from the Province of Valencia
Spanish footballers
Footballers from the Valencian Community
Association football goalkeepers
Segunda División players
Segunda División B players
Tercera División players
Valencia CF Mestalla footballers
Valencia CF players
AD Alcorcón footballers